State Route 197 (SR 197) is a  east-west state highway in the US state of Maine.

Route description
SR 197 begins in Sabattus at the intersection with SR 9 and SR 126. This intersection is SR 197's western terminus. SR 197  heads east. From the corner it is called Litchfield Road. SR 197 then crosses the Sabattus-Wales town line, and then the Wales-Litchfield town line entering Kennebec County, as Litchfield Road becomes Richmond Road instead. SR 197 then passes over Interstate 95. Even though it is an east–west highway, it takes a sharp curve and heads south, and then it takes an easterly turn. The route enters Sagadahoc County and Bowdoin briefly and becomes County Rd. It SR 197 then enters Richmond intersects U.S. Route 201, called Brunswick Rd (northbound) and Augusta Rd (southbound).  and intersects SR 138. SR 197 continues to head east. It then and crosses the West Branch Denham Stream before coming to an interchange with on and off ramps onto Interstate 295. SR 197 continues to head east. In downtown Richmond, it has a concurrency with SR 24. SR 24 then branches off SR 197. A bridge carries SR 197 across the Kennebec River, into Lincoln County, and into the town of Dresden. It then junctions SR 128, crosses the Eastern River, and turns onto Middle Rd (This is also a junction with the northern terminus of SR 127). SR 197 continues along Middle Rd until the intersection with SR 27, where SR 197 has its eastern terminus.

Major junctions

See also
Portal:U.S. Roads

References

External links

Floodgap Roadgap's RoadsAroundME: Maine State Route 197

197
Transportation in Androscoggin County, Maine
Transportation in Kennebec County, Maine
Transportation in Sagadahoc County, Maine
Transportation in Lincoln County, Maine